"Caribbean Queen (No More Love on the Run)" is a 1984 song by Trinidadian-British singer Billy Ocean. Co-written and produced by Keith Diamond, it climbed to number one on both the US Billboard Hot 100 chart and the Billboard Black Singles chart, and number six in the UK Singles Chart. The song won Ocean the 1985 Grammy Award for Best Male R&B Vocal Performance, making him the first British artist to win in that category.

The saxophone solo is played by Vernon Jeffrey Smith. It is written and recorded in the key of D minor.

History
The song was recorded under different titles for different parts of the world—resulting in versions such as "European Queen" and "African Queen". In the US, the song was released under the title "Caribbean Queen (No More Love on the Run)". It entered the Billboard Hot 100 at number 85 on the chart dated 11 August 1984. It hit number one ten weeks later and stayed at the top of the chart for two consecutive weeks. The song charted for 26 weeks.

Charts and certifications

"Caribbean Queen (No More Love on the Run)"

Weekly charts

Year-end charts

"African Queen"

"European Queen"

Weekly charts

Year-end charts

Certifications and sales

See also
List of Billboard Hot 100 number-one singles of 1984
List of number-one dance singles of 1984 (U.S.)
List of number-one singles of 1984 (Canada)
List of number-one singles from the 1980s (New Zealand)
List of number-one R&B singles of 1984 (U.S.)

References

1984 songs
1984 singles
Billy Ocean songs
Jive Records singles
Post-disco songs
Billboard Hot 100 number-one singles
RPM Top Singles number-one singles
Number-one singles in New Zealand
Songs written by Keith Diamond (songwriter)
Songs written by Billy Ocean